John Joseph Paul (August 17, 1918 – March 5, 2006) was an American prelate of the Roman Catholic Church who served as an auxiliary bishop and bishop of the Diocese of La Crosse in Wisconsin from 1977 to 1994

Biography

Early years
John Paul was born on August 17, 1918, in La Crosse, Wisconsin.  He graduated from Aquinas High School in La Crosse in 1935 and from Loras College in Dubuque, Iowa in 1939.

Ordination and ministry
Paul was ordained to the priesthood on January 24, 1943 by Auxiliary Bishop William Griffin at St. Rose of Viterbo Convent in La Crosse,  the motherhouse of the Franciscan Sisters of Perpetual Adoration. While stationed in Eau Claire, Wisconsin, Paul help established Regis High School.

In 1955, Paul became rector of Holy Cross Seminary in La Crosse. On October 7, 1956, Pope Pius XII made Paul a monsignor. In 1956, Paul received a master's degree in education from Marquette University. In 1966, Paul became rector of the Cathedral of St. Joseph the Workman in La Crosse.

Auxiliary Bishop and Bishop of La Crosse
Paul was appointed auxiliary bishop for the Diocese of La Crosse on May 17, 1977 by Pope Paul VI.  Paul was consecrated on August 4, 1977.

On October 14, 1983, Paul was appointed bishop of the Diocese of La Crosse by Pope John Paul II, succeeding Bishop Frederick Freking.  On December 5, 1983, he was installed as bishop. In 1986, Paul convened the fourth diocesan synod following the revised Canon Law of 1983; in 1987, the decrees of the fourth diocesan synod were published as: The Bishop With His People.  In 1992, Paul founded the Aquinas Middle School in La Crosse.

On December 10, 1994, Paul submitted his resignation as bishop of La Crosse to John Paul II;  he was succeeded by Bishop Raymond Burke.  John Paul died at Franciscan Skemp Medical Center in La Crosse on Marcy 5, 2006, at age 87.

See also

 Catholic Church hierarchy
 Catholic Church in the United States
 Historical list of the Catholic bishops of the United States
 List of Catholic bishops of the United States
 Lists of patriarchs, archbishops, and bishops

References

Further reading
 Landers, Ann. 'A Life In Letters: Ann Landers' letters to her only child, New York: Warner Brothers, 2003. (Landers refers to Paul, when both were living in Eau Claire, Wisconsin.)

External links
Regis High School, Eau Claire, Wisconsin
Loras College Athletic Hall of Fame
Bishop John Paul Memorial - Diocese of La Crosse
Bishop John Joseph Paul, Catholic Hierarchy website
Roman Catholic Diocese of La Crosse

1918 births
2006 deaths
Aquinas High School (La Crosse, Wisconsin) alumni
Loras College alumni
Marquette University alumni
People from Eau Claire, Wisconsin
Roman Catholic bishops of La Crosse
20th-century Roman Catholic bishops in the United States